Saidi (also Romanized as Sa‘īdī; also known as Bāgh-e Seyyedī, Sa‘di, and Sa‘īdābād) is a village in Derakhtengan Rural District, in the Central District of Kerman County, Kerman Province, Iran. At the 2006 census, its population was 3,993, in 1,008 families.

References 

Populated places in Kerman County